Murphy Adventist Christian School is a private Christian school located in Murphy, North Carolina. It covers grades pre-kindergarten through 12 with an active enrollment of 18 students. It has a student to teacher ratio of 18:1.

References

Christian schools in North Carolina
Schools in Cherokee County, North Carolina
Private high schools in North Carolina
Private middle schools in North Carolina
Private elementary schools in North Carolina
Adventist secondary schools in the United States